Jujubinus striatus, common name the grooved top shell, is a species of sea snail, a marine gastropod mollusk in the family Trochidae, the top snails.

Subspecies
 Jujubinus striatus delpreteanus Sulliotti, 1889
 Jujubinus striatus striatus (Linnaeus, 1758)

Description

The size of the shell varies between 6 mm and 13 mm. The small, imperforate, solid shell has an elongate-conical shape. It is brown or yellowish olive, rarely unicolored, striped or lined longitudinally with white, sometimes the striping broken into a tessellated pattern. The surface is dull or shining. The whorls show a much less prominent ridge at the periphery than in Jujubinus exasperatus. The supra-sutural fasciole when discernible, is not projecting nor prominent. The whorls are encircled by numerous subequal lirulae. The interstices are slightly or strongly obliquely striate. The base of the shell contains numerous striae or riblets, about double the number possessed by Jujubinus exasperatus.

This species is distinguished from Jujubinus exasperatus, a species of nearly the same size and outline, by its finer more numerous spiral striae, and a less strongly truncate columella.

Distribution
This species occurs in the English Channel, the Atlantic Ocean from France to the Azores and the Canary Islands and Madeira; and in the Mediterranean Sea.

List of synonyms

 Calliostoma striatum (Linnaeus, 1758)
 Jujubinus altior Coen, 1937 
 Jujubinus brugnonei Coen, 1937 
 Jujubinus decipiens Parenzan, 1970 (dubious synonym)
 Jujubinus defiorei Coen, 1937 
 Jujubinus delpreteanus Sulliotti, 1889 
 Jujubinus depictus (Deshayes, 1835)
 Jujubinus depictus var. phasiana Pallary 1906
 Jujubinus depictus var. funerea Sulliotti 1889
 Jujubinus depictus var. hieroglyphica Sulliotti 1889
 Jujubinus depictus var. ligata Sulliotti 1889
 Jujubinus depictus var. rubra Sulliotti 1889
 Jujubinus elenchoides (Issel, 1878)
 Jujubinus elenchoides orientalis Nordsieck, 1973
 Jujubinus fraterculus var. atra Pallary 1906 
 Jujubinus fraterculus var. fuscoviolacea Pallary 1904
 Jujubinus fraterculus var. marmorata Pallary 1906
 Jujubinus fraterculus var. minor Pallary 1906
 Jujubinus goniobasis Coen, 1937 
 Jujubinus magnificus Coen, 1937 
 Jujubinus multistriatus Ghisotti & Melone, 1975 
 Jujubinus propinquus Ghisotti & Melone, 1975 (dubious synonym)
 Jujubinus smaragdinus (Monterosato, 1880)
 Trochus cingulatus Grube, 1839 
 Trochus conicus Donovan, 1803 
 Trochus depictus Deshayes, 1835 
 Trochus depictus var. ardens Sulliotti 1889
 Trochus depictus var. atrata Sulliotti 1889
 Trochus depictus var. elegans Sulliotti 1889
 Trochus depictus var. flava Sulliotti 1889
 Trochus elenchoides Monterosato
 Trochus fraterculus Monterosato 1880
 Trochus gravesi Forbes, 1844 
 Trochus littoralis Brusina, 1865 
 Trochus parvulus Brusina 1865  
 Trochus parvus Costa, E.M. da
 Trochus sartorii Aradas & Benoit 1841 
 Trochus scacchi Aradas 1846 
 Trochus sericeus Pallary 1904
 Trochus smaragdinus Monterosato, 1883
 Trochus smaragdinus var. albina Bucquoy, Dautzenberg & Dollfus 1884
 Trochus smaragdinus var. aurea Dautzenberg 1883
 Trochus striatus (Linnaeus, 1758)
 Trochus striatus var. elenchoides Issel 1878 
 Trochus striatus var. smaragdina Monterosato 1880
 Zizyphinus (Jujubinus) aequistriatus Monterosato, 1884

References

 Da Costa E. M., 1778: Historia Naturalis Testaceorum Britanniae ; London: Millan, White, Elmsley & Robson XII + 254 + VIII p., 17 pl 
 Donovan E., 1801–1804: The natural history of British shells, Including figures and descriptions of all the species hitherto discovered in Great Britain, systematically arranged in the Linnean manner, with scientific and general observations on each; printed for the author, and F. & C: Rivington, London vol. 1 [1800], pl. 1–36; vol. 2 [1801], pl. 37–72; vol. 3 [1801], pl. 73–108; vol. 4 [1803], pl. 109–144; vol. 5 [1804], pl. 145–180, all with unpaginated text and indexes
 Deshayes G. P., 1835: Mollusques. Pp. 81–203, pl. 18–26, in Bory de Saint-Vincent J.B.G.M. (ed.), Expédition scientifique de Morée. Section des Sciences Physiques. Tome III. 1ere Partie. Zoologie. Première Section. Animaux vertébrés, Mollusques et Polypiers.; Levrault, Paris 81–203 pl. 18–26
 Aradas A. & Maggiore G., 1841?: Sunto di quattro memorie malacologiche... Monografia del genere Eulima dal Sig. Risso per la fauna Siciliana. Monografia del genere Orthostelis. Monografia del genere Maravignia. Descrizione di due nuove specie siciliane del genere Trochus.; Giornale del Gabinetto Gioenio 6(3): 1–10 Philippi (1844: 225) 
 Forbes E., 1844: Report on the Mollusca and Radiata of the Aegean sea, and on their distribution, considered as bearing on geology; Reports of the British Association for the Advancement of Science; (1843): 130–193
 Philippi R. A., 1844: Enumeratio molluscorum Siciliae cum viventium tum in tellure tertiaria fossilium, quae in itinere suo observavit. Vol. 2; Eduard Anton, Halle [Halis Saxorum] iv + 303 p., pl. 13–28 
 Aradas A., 1846: Memoria I. Descrizione di varie specie nuove di conchiglie viventi e fossili della Sicilia; Atti dell'Accademia Gioenia di Scienze Naturali (2) 3: 157–184
 Brusina S., 1865: Conchiglie dalmate inedite; Verhandlungen der Kaiserlich-königlichen Zoologisch-botanisch Gesellschaft in Wien, 15: 3–42
 Monterosato T. A. (di), 1880: Notizie intorno ad alcune conchiglie delle coste d'Africa; Bullettino della Società Malacologica Italiana, Pisa 5: 213–233. (1879)
 Dautzenberg P., 1883: Liste de coquilles du Golfe de Gabès; Journal de Conchyliologie 31: 289–330 
 Monterosato T. A. (di), 1883–1885: Conchiglie littorali mediterranee ; Naturalista Siciliano, Palermo 3 (3): 87–91 (1883) 3 (4): 102–111 3 (5): 137–140 3 (6): 159–163 3 (8): 227–231 3 (10): 277–281 4 (1–2): 21–25 4 (3): 60–63 (1884) 4 (4): (80–84) 4 (8): 200–204 (1885)
 Bucquoy E., Dautzenberg P. & Dollfus G., 1882–1886: Les mollusques marins du Roussillon. Tome Ier. Gastropodes.; Paris, J.B. Baillière & fils 570 p., 66 pl.
 Sulliotti G. R., 1889: Comunicazioni malacologiche I; Bullettino della Società Malacologica Italiana 14: 25–44
 Pallary P., 1904–1906: Addition à la faune malacologique du Golfe de Gabès; Journal de Conchyliologie 52: 212–248, pl. 7; 54: 77–124, pl. 4
 Parenzan P., 1970–1976: Carta d'identità delle conchiglie del Mediterraneo; Taranto, Bios Taras Vol. 1 (Gasteropodi): 1–283 [1970]. Vol. 2 parte 1 (Bivalvi): 1–277 con 46 tav. [1974]. Vol. 2 parte 2 (Bivalvi): 283–546 con 56 tav. [1976]. Vol. 3 (Bibliografia): 1–50
 Coen G., 1937: Nuovo saggio di una sylloge molluscorum Adriaticorum; Memoria Reale Comitato Talassografico Italiano 240, 1–173, 10 pls
 Nordsieck F., 1973: Il genere Jujubinus Monterosato, 1884 in Europa; La Conchiglia 50: 6–7, 11–12
 Ghisotti F. & Melone G., 1969–1975: Catalogo illustrato delle conchiglie marine del Mediterraneo; Conchiglie Part 1: suppl. 5 (11–12): 1–28 [1969]. Part 2: suppl. 6 (3–4): 29–46 [1970]. Part 3: suppl. 7 (1–2): 47–77 [1971]. Part 4. suppl. 8 (11–12): 79–144 [1972]. Part 5. suppl. 11 (11–12): 147–208 [1975]
 Gofas, S.; Le Renard, J.; Bouchet, P. (2001). Mollusca, in: Costello, M.J. et al. (Ed.) (2001). European register of marine species: a check-list of the marine species in Europe and a bibliography of guides to their identification. Collection Patrimoines Naturels, 50: pp. 180–213

External links
 

striatus
Gastropods described in 1758
Taxa named by Carl Linnaeus